An ebook (short for electronic book), also known as an e-book or eBook, is a book publication made available in digital form, consisting of text, images, or both, readable on the flat-panel display of computers or other electronic devices. Although sometimes defined as "an electronic version of a printed book", some e-books exist without a printed equivalent. E-books can be read on dedicated e-reader devices, but also on any computer device that features a controllable viewing screen, including desktop computers, laptops, tablets and smartphones.

In the 2000s, there was a trend of print and e-book sales moving to the Internet, where readers buy traditional paper books and e-books on websites using e-commerce systems. With print books, readers are increasingly browsing through images of the covers of books on publisher or bookstore websites and selecting and ordering titles online; the paper books are then delivered to the reader by mail or another delivery service. With e-books, users can browse through titles online, and then when they select and order titles, the e-book can be sent to them online or the user can download the e-book. By the early 2010s, e-books had begun to overtake hardcover by overall publication figures in the U.S.

The main reasons for people buying e-books are possibly lower prices, increased comfort (as they can buy from home or on the go with mobile devices) and a larger selection of titles. With e-books, "electronic bookmarks make referencing easier, and e-book readers may allow the user to annotate pages." "Although fiction and non-fiction books come in e-book formats, technical material is especially suited for e-book delivery because it can be digitally searched" for keywords. In addition, for programming books, code examples can be copied. The amount of e-book reading is increasing in the U.S.; by 2014, 28% of adults had read an e-book, compared to 23% in 2013; and by 2014, 50% of American adults had an e-reader or a tablet, compared to 30% owning such devices in 2013.

Besides published books and magazines that have a digital equivalent, there are also digital textbooks, that are intended to serve as the text for a class and help in technology-based education.

Terminology

E-books are also referred to as "ebooks", "eBooks", "Ebooks", "e-Books", "e-journals", "e-editions", or "digital books". A device that is designed specifically for reading e-books is called an "e-reader", "ebook device", or "eReader".

History

The Readies (1930)
Some trace the concept of an e-reader, a device that would enable the user to view books on a screen, to a 1930 manifesto by Bob Brown, written after watching his first "talkie" (movie with sound). He titled it The Readies, playing off the idea of the "talkie". In his book, Brown says movies have outmaneuvered the book by creating the "talkies" and, as a result, reading should find a new medium:

Brown's notion, however, was much more focused on reforming orthography and vocabulary, than on medium ("It is time to pull out the stopper" and begin "a bloody revolution of the word."): introducing huge numbers of portmanteau symbols to replace normal words, and punctuation to simulate action or movement; so it is not clear whether this fits into the history of "e-books" or not. Later e-readers never followed a model at all like Brown's; however, he correctly predicted the miniaturization and portability of e-readers. In an article, Jennifer Schuessler writes, "The machine, Brown argued, would allow readers to adjust the type size, avoid paper cuts and save trees, all while hastening the day when words could be 'recorded directly on the palpitating ether.'" Brown believed that the e-reader (and his notions for changing the  text itself) would bring a completely new life to reading. Schuessler correlates it with a DJ spinning bits of old songs to create a beat or an entirely new song, as opposed to just a remix of a familiar song.

Inventor
The inventor of the first e-book is not widely agreed upon. Some notable candidates include the following:

Roberto Busa (1946–1970)
The first e-book may be the Index Thomisticus, a heavily annotated electronic index to the works of Thomas Aquinas, prepared by Roberto Busa, S.J. beginning in 1946 and completed in the 1970s. Although originally stored on a single computer, a distributable CD-ROM version appeared in 1989. However, this work is sometimes omitted; perhaps because the digitized text was a means for studying written texts and developing linguistic concordances, rather than as a published edition in its own right. In 2005, the Index was published online.

Ángela Ruiz Robles (1949)
In 1949, Ángela Ruiz Robles, a teacher from Ferrol, Spain, patented the Enciclopedia Mecánica, or the Mechanical Encyclopedia, a mechanical device which operated on compressed air where text and graphics were contained on spools that users would load onto rotating spindles. Her idea was to create a device which would decrease the number of books that her pupils carried to school. The final device was planned to include audio recordings, a magnifying glass, a calculator, and an electric light for night reading. Her device was never put into production but a prototype is on display at the National Museum of Science and Technology in A Coruña.

Douglas Engelbart and Andries van Dam (1960s)
Alternatively, some historians consider electronic books to have started in the early 1960s, with the NLS project headed by Douglas Engelbart at Stanford Research Institute (SRI), and the Hypertext Editing System and FRESS projects headed by Andries van Dam at Brown University. FRESS documents ran on IBM mainframes and were structure-oriented rather than line-oriented; they were formatted dynamically for different users, display hardware, window sizes, and so on, as well as having automated tables of contents, indexes, and so on. All these systems also provided extensive hyperlinking, graphics, and other capabilities. Van Dam is generally thought to have coined the term "electronic book", and it was established enough to use in an article title by 1985.

FRESS was used for reading extensive primary texts online, as well as for annotation and online discussions in several courses, including English Poetry and Biochemistry. Brown's faculty made extensive use of FRESS; for example the philosopher Roderick Chisholm used it to produce several of his books. Thus in the Preface to Person and Object (1979) he writes "The book would not have been completed without the epoch-making File Retrieval and Editing System..." Brown University's work in electronic book systems continued for many years, including US Navy funded projects for electronic repair-manuals; a large-scale distributed hypermedia system known as InterMedia; a spinoff company Electronic Book Technologies that built DynaText, the first SGML-based e-reader system; and the Scholarly Technology Group's extensive work on the Open eBook standard.

Michael S. Hart (1971)
Despite the extensive earlier history, several publications report Michael S. Hart as the inventor of the e-book. In 1971, the operators of the Xerox Sigma V mainframe at the University of Illinois gave Hart extensive computer-time. Seeking a worthy use of this resource, he created his first electronic document by typing the United States Declaration of Independence into a computer in plain text. Hart planned to create documents using plain text to make them as easy as possible to download and view on devices. After Hart first adapted the U.S. Declaration of Independence into an electronic document in 1971, Project Gutenberg was launched to create electronic copies of more texts, especially books.

Early hardware implementations
Dedicated hardware devices for ebook reading began to appear in the 70s and 80s, in addition to the mainframe and laptop solutions, and collections of data per se. One early e-book implementation was the desktop prototype for a proposed notebook computer, the Dynabook, in the 1970s at PARC: a general-purpose portable personal computer capable of displaying books for reading. In 1980, the U.S. Department of Defense began concept development for a portable electronic delivery device for technical maintenance information called project PEAM, the Portable Electronic Aid for Maintenance. Detailed specifications were completed in FY 1981/82, and prototype development began with Texas Instruments that same year. Four prototypes were produced and delivered for testing in 1986, and tests were completed in 1987. The final summary report was produced in 1989 by the U.S. Army Research Institute for the Behavioral and Social Sciences, authored by Robert Wisher and J. Peter Kincaid. A patent application for the PEAM device, titled "Apparatus for delivering procedural type instructions", was submitted by Texas Instruments on December 4, 1985, listing John K. Harkins and Stephen H. Morriss as inventors.

In 1992, Sony launched the Data Discman, an electronic book reader that could read e-books that were stored on CDs. One of the electronic publications that could be played on the Data Discman was called The Library of the Future. Early e-books were generally written for specialty areas and a limited audience, meant to be read only by small and devoted interest groups. The scope of the subject matter of these e-books included technical manuals for hardware, manufacturing techniques, and other subjects. In the 1990s, the general availability of the Internet made transferring electronic files much easier, including e-books.

In 1993, Paul Baim released a freeware HyperCard stack, called EBook, that allowed easy import of any text file to create a pageable version similar to an electronic paperback book. A notable feature was automatic tracking of the last page read so that on returning to the 'book' you were taken back to where you had previously left off reading. The title of this stack may have helped popularize the term 'ebook'.

E-book formats

As e-book formats emerged and proliferated, some garnered support from major software companies, such as Adobe with its PDF format that was introduced in 1993. Unlike most other formats, PDF documents are generally tied to a particular dimension and layout, rather than adjusting dynamically to the current page, window, or another size. Different e-reader devices followed different formats, most of them accepting books in only one or a few formats, thereby fragmenting the e-book market even more. Due to the exclusiveness and limited readerships of e-books, the fractured market of independent publishers and specialty authors lacked consensus regarding a standard for packaging and selling e-books.

Meanwhile, scholars formed the Text Encoding Initiative, which developed consensus guidelines for encoding books and other materials of scholarly interest for a variety of analytic uses as well as reading, and countless literary and other works have been developed using the TEI approach. In the late 1990s, a consortium formed to develop the Open eBook format as a way for authors and publishers to provide a single source-document which many book-reading software and hardware platforms could handle. Several scholars from the TEI were closely involved in the early development of Open eBook, including Allen Renear, Elli Mylonas, and Steven DeRose, all from Brown. Focused on portability, Open eBook as defined required subsets of XHTML and CSS; a set of multimedia formats (others could be used, but there must also be a fallback in one of the required formats), and an XML schema for a "manifest", to list the components of a given e-book, identify a table of contents, cover art, and so on. This format led to the open format EPUB. Google Books has converted many public domain works to this open format.

In 2010, e-books continued to gain in their own specialist and underground markets. Many e-book publishers began distributing books that were in the public domain. At the same time, authors with books that were not accepted by publishers offered their works online so they could be seen by others. Unofficial (and occasionally unauthorized) catalogs of books became available on the web, and sites devoted to e-books began disseminating information about e-books to the public. Nearly two-thirds of the U.S. Consumer e-book publishing market are controlled by the "Big Five". The "Big Five" publishers are: Hachette, HarperCollins, Macmillan, Penguin Random House and Simon & Schuster.

Libraries
U.S. libraries began to offer free e-books to the public in 1998 through their websites and associated services, although the e-books were primarily scholarly, technical, or professional in nature, and could not be downloaded. In 2003, libraries began offering free downloadable popular fiction and non-fiction e-books to the public, launching an e-book lending model that worked much more successfully for public libraries. The number of library e-book distributors and lending models continued to increase over the next few years. From 2005 to 2008, libraries experienced a 60% growth in e-book collections. In 2010, a Public Library Funding and Technology Access Study by the American Library Association found that 66% of public libraries in the U.S. were offering e-books, and a large movement in the library industry began to seriously examine the issues relating to e-book lending, acknowledging a "tipping point" when e-book technology would become widely established. Content from public libraries can be downloaded to e-readers using application software like Overdrive and Hoopla.

The U.S. National Library of Medicine has for many years provided PubMed, a comprehensive bibliography of medical literature. In early 2000, NLM set up the PubMed Central repository, which stores full-text e-book versions of many medical journal articles and books, through cooperation with scholars and publishers in the field. Pubmed Central also now provides archiving and access to over 4.1 million articles, maintained in a standard XML format known as the Journal Article Tag Suite (JATS).

Despite the widespread adoption of e-books, some publishers and authors have not endorsed the concept of electronic publishing, citing issues with user demand, copyright infringement and challenges with proprietary devices and systems. In a survey of interlibrary loan (ILL) librarians, it was found that 92% of libraries held e-books in their collections and that 27% of those libraries had negotiated ILL rights for some of their e-books. This survey found significant barriers to conducting interlibrary loan for e-books. Patron-driven acquisition (PDA) has been available for several years in public libraries, allowing vendors to streamline the acquisition process by offering to match a library's selection profile to the vendor's e-book titles. The library's catalog is then populated with records for all of the e-books that match the profile. The decision to purchase the title is left to the patrons, although the library can set purchasing conditions such as a maximum price and purchasing caps so that the dedicated funds are spent according to the library's budget. The 2012 meeting of the Association of American University Presses included a panel on the PDA of books produced by university presses, based on a preliminary report by Joseph Esposito, a digital publishing consultant who has studied the implications of PDA with a grant from the Andrew W. Mellon Foundation.

Challenges
Although the demand for e-book services in libraries has grown in the first two decades of the 21st century, difficulties keep libraries from providing some e-books to clients. Publishers will sell e-books to libraries, but in most cases they will only give libraries a limited license to the title, meaning that the library does not own the electronic text but is allowed to circulate it for either a certain period of time, or a certain number of check outs, or both. When a library purchases an e-book license, the cost is at least three times what it would be for a personal consumer. E-book licenses are more expensive than paper-format editions because publishers are concerned that an e-book that is sold could theoretically be read and/or checked out by a huge number of users, potentially damaging sales. However, some studies have found the opposite effect to be true (for example, Hilton and Wikey 2010).

Archival storage
The Internet Archive and Open Library offer more than six million fully accessible public domain e-books. Project Gutenberg has over 52,000 freely available public domain e-books.

Dedicated hardware readers and mobile software

An e-reader, also called an e-book reader or e-book device, is a mobile electronic device that is designed primarily for the purpose of reading e-books and digital periodicals. An e-reader is similar in form, but more limited in purpose than a tablet. In comparison to tablets, many e-readers are better than tablets for reading because they are more portable, have better readability in sunlight and have longer battery life. In July 2010, online bookseller Amazon.com reported sales of e-books for its proprietary Kindle outnumbered sales of hardcover books for the first time ever during the second quarter of 2010, saying it sold 140 e-books for every 100 hardcover books, including hardcovers for which there was no digital edition. By January 2011, e-book sales at Amazon had surpassed its paperback sales. In the overall US market, paperback book sales are still much larger than either hardcover or e-book; the American Publishing Association estimated e-books represented 8.5% of sales as of mid-2010, up from 3% a year before. At the end of the first quarter of 2012, e-book sales in the United States surpassed hardcover book sales for the first time.

Until late 2013, use of an e-reader was not allowed on airplanes during takeoff and landing by the FAA. In November 2013, the FAA allowed use of e-readers on airplanes at all times if it is in Airplane Mode, which means all radios turned off, and Europe followed this guidance the next month. In 2014, The New York Times predicted that by 2018 e-books will make up over 50% of total consumer publishing revenue in the United States and Great Britain.

Applications

Some of the major book retailers and multiple third-party developers offer free (and in some third-party cases, premium paid) e-reader software applications (apps) for the Mac and PC computers as well as for Android, Blackberry, iPad, iPhone, Windows Phone and Palm OS devices to allow the reading of e-books and other documents independently of dedicated e-book devices. Examples are apps for the Amazon Kindle, Barnes & Noble Nook, iBooks, Kobo eReader and Sony Reader.

Timeline

Before the 1980s
c. 1949
 Ángela Ruiz Robles patents the idea of the electronic book, called the Mechanical Encyclopedia, in Galicia, Spain.
 Roberto Busa begins planning the Index Thomisticus.
c. 1963
 Douglas Engelbart starts the NLS (and later Augment) projects.
c. 1965
 Andries van Dam starts the HES (and later FRESS) projects, with assistance from Ted Nelson, to develop and use electronic textbooks for humanities and in pedagogy.
1971
 Michael S. Hart types the US Declaration of Independence into a computer to create the first e-book available on the Internet and launches Project Gutenberg in order to create electronic copies of more books.
c. 1979
 Roberto Busa finishes the Index Thomisticus, a complete lemmatisation of the 56 printed volumes of Saint Thomas Aquinas and of a few related authors.

1980s and 1990s
1986
 Judy Malloy writes and programmes the first online hypertext fiction, Uncle Roger, with links that take the narrative in different directions depending on the reader's choice.
1989
 Franklin Computer releases an electronic edition of the Bible that can only be read with a stand-alone device.
1990
 Eastgate Systems publishes the first hypertext fiction released on floppy disk, afternoon, a story, by Michael Joyce.
 Electronic Book Technologies releases DynaText, the first SGML-based system for delivering large-scale books such as aircraft technical manuals. It was later tested on a US aircraft carrier as replacement for paper manuals.
 Sony launches the Data Discman e-book player.
1991
 Voyager Company develops Expanded Books, which are books on CD-ROM in a digital format.
1992
 F. Crugnola and I. Rigamonti design and create the first e-reader, called Incipit, as a thesis project at the Polytechnic University of Milan.
Apple starts using its DocViewer format "to distribute documentation to developers in an electronic form", which effectively meant Inside Macintosh books.
1993
 Peter James publishes his novel Host on two floppy disks, which at the time was called the "world's first electronic novel"; a copy of it is stored at the Science Museum.
 Hugo Award and Nebula Award nominee works are included on a CD-ROM by Brad Templeton.
 Launch of Bibliobytes, a website for obtaining e-books, both for free and for sale on the Internet.
 Paul Baim releases the EBook 1.0 HyperCard stack that allows the user to easily convert any text file into a HyperCard based pageable book.
1994
 C & M Online is founded in Raleigh, North Carolina and begins publishing e-books through its imprint, Boson Books; authors include Fred Chappell, Kelly Cherry, Leon Katz, Richard Popkin, and Robert Rodman.
 More than two dozen volumes of Inside Macintosh are published together on a single CD-ROM in Apple DocViewer format. Apple subsequently switches to using Adobe Acrobat.
 The popular format for publishing e-books changes from plain text to HTML.
1995
 Online poet Alexis Kirke discusses the need for wireless internet electronic paper readers in his article "The Emuse".
1996
 Project Gutenberg reaches 1,000 titles.
 Joseph Jacobson works at MIT to create electronic ink, a high-contrast, low-cost, read/write/erase medium to display e-books.
1997
 E Ink Corporation is co-founded by MIT undergraduates J.D. Albert, Barrett Comiskey, MIT professor Joseph Jacobson, as well as Jeremy Rubin and Russ Wilcox to create an electronic printing technology. This technology is later used on the displays of the Sony Reader, Barnes & Noble Nook, and Amazon Kindle.
1998
 NuvoMedia releases the first handheld e-reader, the Rocket eBook.
 SoftBook launches its SoftBook reader. This e-reader, with expandable storage, could store up to 100,000 pages of content, including text, graphics and pictures.
 The Cybook is sold and manufactured at first by Cytale (1998–2003) and later by Bookeen.
1999
 The NIST releases the Open eBook format based on XML to the public domain; most future e-book formats derive from Open eBook.
 Publisher Simon & Schuster creates a new imprint called iBooks and becomes the first trade publisher to simultaneously publish some of its titles in e-book and print format.
 Oxford University Press makes a selection of its books available as e-books through netLibrary.
 Publisher Baen Books opens up the Baen Free Library to make available Baen titles as free e-books.
 Kim Blagg, via her company Books OnScreen, begins selling multimedia-enhanced e-books on CDs through retailers including Amazon, Barnes & Noble and Borders Books.

2000s
2000
 Joseph Jacobson, Barrett O. Comiskey and Jonathan D. Albert are granted US patents related to displaying electronic books, these patents are later used in the displays for most e-readers.
 Stephen King releases his novella Riding the Bullet exclusively online and it became the first mass-market e-book, selling 500,000 copies in 48 hours.
 Microsoft releases the Microsoft Reader with ClearType for increased readability on PCs and handheld devices.
 Microsoft and Amazon work together to sell e-books that can be purchased on Amazon, and using Microsoft software downloaded to PCs and handhelds.
 A digitized version of the Gutenberg Bible is made available online at the British Library.
2001
 Adobe releases Adobe Acrobat Reader 5.0 allowing users to underline, take notes and bookmark.
2002
 Palm, Inc and OverDrive, Inc make Palm Reader e-books available worldwide, offering over 5,000 e-books in several languages; these could be read on Palm PDAs or using a computer application.
 Random House and HarperCollins start to sell digital versions of their titles in English.
2004
 Sony Librie, the first e-reader using an E Ink display is released; it has a six-inch screen.
 Google announces plans to digitize the holdings of several major libraries, as part of what would later be called the Google Books Library Project.
2005
 Amazon buys Mobipocket, the creator of the mobi e-book file format and e-reader software.
 Google is sued for copyright infringement by the Authors Guild for scanning books still in copyright.
2006
 Sony Reader PRS-500, with an E Ink screen and two weeks of battery life, is released.
 LibreDigital launches BookBrowse as an online reader for publisher content.
2007
 The International Digital Publishing Forum releases EPUB to replace Open eBook.
 In November, Amazon.com releases the Kindle e-reader with 6-inch E Ink screen in the US and it sells outs in 5.5 hours. Simultaneously, the Kindle Store opens, with initially more than 88,000 e-books available.
 Bookeen launches Cybook Gen3 in Europe; it can display e-books and play audiobooks.
2008
 Adobe and Sony agree to share their technologies (Adobe Reader and DRM) with each other.
 Sony sells the Sony Reader PRS-505 in UK and France.
2009
 Bookeen releases the Cybook Opus in the US and Europe.
 Sony releases the Reader Pocket Edition and Reader Touch Edition.
 Amazon releases the Kindle 2 that includes a text-to-speech feature.
 Amazon releases the Kindle DX that has a 9.7-inch screen in the U.S.
 Barnes & Noble releases the Nook e-reader in the US.
 Amazon releases the Kindle for PC application in late 2009, making the Kindle Store library available for the first time outside Kindle hardware.

2010s
2010
 January – Amazon releases the Kindle DX International Edition worldwide.
 April – Apple releases the iPad bundled with an e-book app called iBooks.
 May – Kobo Inc. releases its Kobo eReader to be sold at Indigo/Chapters in Canada and Borders in the United States.
 July – Amazon reports that its e-book sales outnumbered sales of hardcover books for the first time during the second quarter of 2010.
 August – PocketBook expands its line with an Android e-reader.
 August – Amazon releases the third generation Kindle, available in Wi-Fi and 3G & Wi-Fi versions.
 October – Bookeen reveals the Cybook Orizon at CES.
 October – Kobo Inc. releases an updated Kobo eReader, which includes Wi-Fi capability.
 November – The Sentimentalists wins the prestigious national Giller Prize in Canada; due to the small scale of the novel's publisher, the book is not widely available in printed form, so the e-book edition becomes the top-selling title on Kobo devices for 2010.
 November – Barnes & Noble releases the Nook Color, a color LCD tablet.
 December – Google launches Google eBooks offering over 3 million titles, becoming the world's largest e-book store to date.
2011
 May – Amazon.com announces that its e-book sales in the US now exceed all of its printed book sales.
 June – Barnes & Noble releases the Nook Simple Touch e-reader and Nook Tablet.
 August – Bookeen launches its own e-books store, BookeenStore.com, and starts to sell digital versions of titles in French.
 September – Nature Publishing releases the pilot version of Principles of Biology, a customizable, modular textbook, with no corresponding paper edition.
 June/November – As the e-reader market grows in Spain, companies like Telefónica, Fnac, and Casa del Libro launch their e-readers with the Spanish brand "bq readers".
 November – Amazon launches the Kindle Fire and Kindle Touch, both devices designed for e-reading.
2012
 E-book sales in the US market collect over three billion in revenue.
 January – Apple releases iBooks Author, software for creating iPad e-books to be directly published in its iBooks bookstore or to be shared as PDF files.
 January – Apple opens a textbook section in its iBooks bookstore.
 February – Nature Publishing announces the worldwide release of Principles of Biology, following the success of the pilot version some months earlier.
 February – Library.nu (previously called ebooksclub.org and gigapedia.com, a popular linking website for downloading e-books) is accused of copyright infringement and closed down by court order.
 March – The publishing companies Random House, Holtzbrinck, and arvato bring to market an e-book library called Skoobe.
 March – US Department of Justice prepares anti-trust lawsuit against Apple, Simon & Schuster, Hachette Book Group, Penguin Group, Macmillan, and HarperCollins, alleging collusion to increase the price of books sold on Amazon.
 March – PocketBook releases the PocketBook Touch, an E Ink Pearl e-reader, winning awards from German magazines Tablet PC and Computer Bild.
 June – Kbuuk releases the cloud-based e-book self-publishing SaaS platform on the Pubsoft digital publishing engine.
 September – Amazon releases the Kindle Paperwhite, its first e-reader with built-in front LED lights.
2013
 April – Kobo releases the Kobo Aura HD with a 6.8-inch screen, which is larger than the current models produced by its US competitors.
 May – Mofibo launches the first Scandinavian unlimited access e-book subscription service.
 June – Association of American Publishers announces that e-books now account for about 20% of book sales. Barnes & Noble estimates it has a 27% share of the US e-book market.
 June – Barnes & Noble announces its intention to discontinue manufacturing Nook tablets, but to continue producing black-and-white e-readers such as the Nook Simple Touch.
 June – Apple executive Keith Moerer testifies in the e-book price fixing trial that the iBookstore held approximately 20% of the e-book market share in the United States within the months after launch – a figure that Publishers Weekly reports is roughly double many of the previous estimates made by third parties. Moerer further testified that iBookstore acquired about an additional 20% by adding Random House in 2011.

 Five major US e-book publishers, as part of their settlement of a price-fixing suit, are ordered to refund about $3 for every electronic copy of a New York Times best-seller that they sold from April 2010 to May 2012. This could equal $160 million in settlement charges.
 Barnes & Noble releases the Nook Glowlight, which has a 6-inch touchscreen using E Ink Pearl and Regal, with built-in front LED lights.
 July – US District Court Judge Denise Cote finds Apple guilty of conspiring to raise the retail price of e-books and schedules a trial in 2014 to determine damages.
 August – Kobo releases the Kobo Aura, a baseline touchscreen six-inch e-reader.
 September – Oyster launches its unlimited access e-book subscription service.
 November – US District Judge Chin sides with Google in Authors Guild v. Google, citing fair use. The authors said they would appeal.
 December – Scribd launches the first public unlimited access subscription service for e-books.
2014
 April – Kobo releases the Aura H₂0, the world's first waterproof commercially produced e-reader. 
 June – US District Court Judge Cote grants class action certification to plaintiffs in a lawsuit over Apple's alleged e-book price conspiracy; the plaintiffs are seeking $840 million in damages. Apple appeals the decision.
 June – Apple settles the e-book antitrust case that alleged Apple conspired to e-book price fixing out of court with the States; however if Judge Cote's ruling is overturned in appeal the settlement would be reversed.
 July – Amazon launches Kindle Unlimited, an unlimited-access e-book and audiobook subscription service.
2015
 June – The 2nd US Circuit Court of Appeals with a 2:1 vote concurs with Judge Cote that Apple conspired to e-book price fixing and violated federal antitrust law. Apple appealed the decision.
 June – Amazon releases the Kindle Paperwhite (3rd generation) that is the first e-reader to feature Bookerly, a font exclusively designed for e-readers.
 September – Oyster announces its unlimited access e-book subscription service would be shut down in early 2016 and that it would be acquired by Google.
 September – Malaysian e-book company, e-Sentral, introduces for the first time geo-location distribution technology for e-books via bluetooth beacon. It was first demonstrated in a large scale at Kuala Lumpur International Airport.
 October – Amazon releases the Kindle Voyage that has a 6-inch, 300 ppi E Ink Carta HD display, which was the highest resolution and contrast available in e-readers as of 2014. It also features adaptive LED lights and page turn sensors on the sides of the device. 
 October – Barnes & Noble releases the Glowlight Plus, its first waterproof e-reader.
 October – The US appeals court sides with Google instead of the Authors' Guild, declaring that Google did not violate copyright law in its book scanning project.
 December – Playster launches an unlimited-access subscription service including e-books and audiobooks.
 By the end of 2015, Google Books scanned more than 25 million books.
 By 2015, over 70 million e-readers had been shipped worldwide.
2016
 March – The Supreme Court of the United States declines to hear Apple's appeal against the court's decision of July 2013 that the company conspired to e-book price fixing, hence the previous court decision stands, obliging Apple to pay $450 million.
 April – The Supreme Court declines to hear the Authors Guild's appeal of its book scanning case, so the lower court's decision stands; the result means that Google can scan library books and display snippets in search results without violating US copyright law.
 April – Amazon releases the Kindle Oasis, its first e-reader in five years to have physical page turn buttons and, as a premium product, it includes a leather case with a battery inside; without including the case, it is the lightest e-reader on the market to date.
 August – Kobo releases the Aura One, the first commercial e-reader with a 7.8-inch E Ink Carta HD display.
 By the end of the year, smartphones and tablets have both individually overtaken e-readers as methods for reading an e-book, and paperback book sales are now higher than e-book sales.

2017
 February – The Association of American Publishers releases data showing that the US adult e-book market declined 16.9% in the first nine months of 2016 over the same period in 2015, and Nielsen Book determines that the e-book market had an overall total decline of 16% in 2016 over 2015, including all age groups. This decline is partly due to widespread e-book price increases by major publishers, which has increased the average e-book price from $6 to almost $10.
 February – The US version of Kindle Unlimited comprises more than 1.5 million titles, including over 290,000 foreign language titles.
 March – The Guardian reports that sales of physical books are outperforming digital titles in the UK, since it can be cheaper to buy the physical version of a book when compared to the digital version due to Amazon's deal with publishers that allows agency pricing.
 April – The Los Angeles Times reports that, in 2016, sales of hardcover books were higher than e-books for the first time in five years.
 October – Amazon releases the Oasis 2, the first Kindle to be IPX8 rated meaning that it is water resistant up to 2 meters for up to 60 minutes; it is also the first Kindle to enable white text on a black background, a feature that may be helpful for nighttime reading.

2018
January – U.S. public libraries report record-breaking borrowing of OverDrive e-books over the course of the year, with more than 274 million e-books loaned to card holders, a 22% increase over the 2017 figure.
 October – The EU allowed its member countries to charge the same VAT for ebooks as for paper books.

2019
 May – Barnes & Noble releases the GlowLight Plus e-reader, the largest Nook e-reader to date with a 7.8-inch E Ink screen.

Formats

Writers and publishers have many formats to choose from when publishing e-books. Each format has advantages and disadvantages. The most popular e-readers and their natively supported formats are shown below:

Digital rights management

Most e-book publishers do not warn their customers about the possible implications of the digital rights management tied to their products. Generally, they claim that digital rights management is meant to prevent illegal copying of the e-book. However, in many cases, it is also possible that digital rights management will result in the complete denial of access by the purchaser to the e-book. The e-books sold by most major publishers and electronic retailers, which are Amazon.com, Google, Barnes & Noble, Kobo Inc. and Apple Inc., are DRM-protected and tied to the publisher's e-reader software or hardware. The first major publisher to omit DRM was Tor Books, one of the largest publishers of science fiction and fantasy, in 2012. Smaller e-book publishers such as O'Reilly Media, Carina Press and Baen Books had already forgone DRM previously.

Production

Some e-books are produced simultaneously with the production of a printed format, as described in electronic publishing, though in many instances they may not be put on sale until later. Often, e-books are produced from pre-existing hard-copy books, generally by document scanning, sometimes with the use of robotic book scanners, having the technology to quickly scan books without damaging the original print edition. Scanning a book produces a set of image files, which may additionally be converted into text format by an OCR program. Occasionally, as in some projects, an e-book may be produced by re-entering the text from a keyboard. Sometimes only the electronic version of a book is produced by the publisher. It is possible to release an e-book chapter by chapter as each chapter is written. This is useful in fields such as information technology where topics can change quickly in the months that it takes to write a typical book. It is also possible to convert an electronic book to a printed book by print on demand. However, these are exceptions as tradition dictates that a book be launched in the print format and later if the author wishes an electronic version is produced. The New York Times keeps a list of best-selling e-books, for both fiction and non-fiction.

Reading data
All of the e-readers and reading apps are capable of tracking e-book reading data, and the data could contain which e-books users open, how long the users spend reading each e-book and how much of each e-book is finished. In December 2014, Kobo released e-book reading data collected from over 21 million of its users worldwide. Some of the results were that only 44.4% of UK readers finished the bestselling e-book The Goldfinch and the 2014 top selling e-book in the UK, "One Cold Night", was finished by 69% of readers; this is evidence that while popular e-books are being completely read, some e-books are only sampled.

Comparison to printed books

Advantages

In the space that a comparably sized physical book takes up, an e-reader can contain thousands of e-books, limited only by its memory capacity. Depending on the device, an e-book may be readable in low light or even total darkness. Many e-readers have a built-in light source, can enlarge or change fonts, use text-to-speech software to read the text aloud for visually impaired, elderly or dyslexic people or just for convenience. Additionally, e-readers allow readers to look up words or find more information about the topic immediately using an online dictionary. Amazon reports that 85% of its e-book readers look up a word while reading.

A 2017 study found that even when accounting for the emissions created in manufacturing the e-reader device, substituting more than 4.7 print books a year resulted in less greenhouse gas emissions than print. While an e-reader costs more than most individual books, e-books may have a lower cost than paper books. E-books may be made available for less than the price of traditional books using on-demand book printers. Moreover, numerous e-books are available online free of charge on sites such as Project Gutenberg. For example, all books printed before 1923 are in the public domain in the United States, which enables websites to host ebook versions of such titles for free.

Depending on possible digital rights management, e-books (unlike physical books) can be backed up and recovered in the case of loss or damage to the device on which they are stored, a new copy can be downloaded without incurring an additional cost from the distributor. Readers can synchronize their reading location, highlights and bookmarks across several devices.

Disadvantages

There may be a lack of privacy for the user's e-book reading activities; for example, Amazon knows the user's identity, what the user is reading, whether the user has finished the book, what page the user is on, how long the user has spent on each page, and which passages the user may have highlighted. One obstacle to wide adoption of the e-book is that a large portion of people value the printed book as an object itself, including aspects such as the texture, smell, weight and appearance on the shelf. Print books are also considered valuable cultural items, and symbols of liberal education and the humanities. Kobo found that 60% of e-books that are purchased from their e-book store are never opened and found that the more expensive the book is, the more likely the reader would at least open the e-book.

Joe Queenan has written about the pros and cons of e-books:

Apart from all the emotional and habitual aspects, there are also some readability and usability issues that need to be addressed by publishers and software developers. Many e-book readers who complain about eyestrain, lack of overview and distractions could be helped if they could use a more suitable device or a more user-friendly reading application, but when they buy or borrow a DRM-protected e-book, they often have to read the book on the default device or application, even if it has insufficient functionality.

While a paper book is vulnerable to various threats, including water damage, mold and theft, e-books files may be corrupted, deleted or otherwise lost as well as pirated. Where the ownership of a paper book is fairly straightforward (albeit subject to restrictions on renting or copying pages, depending on the book), the purchaser of an e-book's digital file has conditional access with the possible loss of access to the e-book due to digital rights management provisions, copyright issues, the provider's business failing or possibly if the user's credit card expired.

Market share

United States
According to the Association of American Publishers 2018 annual report, ebooks accounted for 12.4% of the total trade revenue.

Publishers of books in all formats made $22.6 billion in print form and $2.04 billion in e-books, according to the Association of American Publishers’ annual report 2019.

Canada

Spain
In 2013, Carrenho estimates that e-books would have a 15% market share in Spain in 2015.

UK
According to Nielsen Book Research, e-book share went up from 20% to 33% between 2012 and 2014, but down to 29% in the first quarter of 2015. Amazon-published and self-published titles accounted for 17 million of those books (worth £58m) in 2014, representing 5% of the overall book market and 15% of the digital market. The volume and value sales, although similar to 2013, had seen a 70% increase since 2012.

Germany
The Wischenbart Report 2015 estimates the e-book market share to be 4.3%.

Brazil
The Brazilian e-book market is only emerging. Brazilians are technology savvy, and that attitude is shared by the government. In 2013, around 2.5% of all trade titles sold were in digital format. This was a 400% growth over 2012 when only 0.5% of trade titles were digital. In 2014, the growth was slower, and Brazil had 3.5% of its trade titles being sold as e-books.

China
The Wischenbart Report 2015 estimates the e-book market share to be around 1%.

Public domain books 

Public domain books are those whose copyrights have expired, meaning they can be copied, edited, and sold freely without restrictions. Many of these books can be downloaded for free from websites like the Internet Archive, in formats that many e-readers support, such as PDF, TXT, and EPUB. Books in other formats may be converted to an e-reader-compatible format using e-book writing software, for example Calibre.

See also

 Accessible publishing
 Book scanning
 Blook
 Cell phone novel
 Digital library
 Braille e-book
 Electronic publishing
 List of digital library projects
 Networked book
 Online book
 TeX and LaTeX
 Web fiction
 Braille translator
 Perkins Brailler
 Comparison of e-readers

References

External links

 James, Bradley (November 20, 2002). The Electronic Book: Looking Beyond the Physical Codex, SciNet
 Cory Doctorow (February 12, 2004). Ebooks: Neither E, Nor Books , O'Reilly Emerging Technologies Conference
 Lynch, Clifford (May 28, 2001). The Battle to Define the Future of the Book in the Digital World, First Monday – Peer reviewed journal.
  
 .
 Dene Grigar & Stuart Moulthrop (2013–2016) "Pathfinders: Documenting the Experience of Early Digital Literature" , Washington State University Vancouver, July 1, 2013. 
 

 
Book formats
Electronic paper technology
Electronic publishing
Fiction forms
New media
Web fiction